Uneedus is an unincorporated community in Tangipahoa Parish, in the U.S. state of Louisiana.

History
The community's name is derived from shortening and alteration of "You need us", the motto of a local lumber company. A post office called Uneedus was established in 1912, and remained in operation until 1928.

References

Unincorporated communities in Louisiana
Unincorporated communities in Tangipahoa Parish, Louisiana